The 1968 Campeonato Brasileiro Série A (officially the 1968 Taça Brasil) was the 12th edition of the Campeonato Brasileiro Série A.

Northern Zone

First phase

Group 1

Group 2

Group 3

Second phase

Quarterfinals

Semifinals

Finals

Central Zone

First phase

Group 1

Group 2

Second phase

Semifinals

Finals

Southern Zone

Quarterfinals

Semifinals

Final

References

External links
1968 Taça Brasil

Bra
Taça Brasil
Taça Brasil seasons
B